Curt Ernst Carl Schumacher, better known as Kurt Schumacher (13 October 1895 – 20 August 1952), was a German politician who became chairman of the Social Democratic Party of Germany from 1946 and the first Leader of the Opposition in the West German Bundestag in 1949; he served in both positions until his death. An opponent of Chancellor Konrad Adenauer's government but an even stronger opponent of the Socialist Unity Party of Germany in East Germany, he was one of the founding fathers of postwar German democracy. He was an opponent of reactionary and revolutionary forces, the Nazi Party and the Communist Party of Germany (KPD) during the Weimar Republic and described the KPD as "red-painted Nazis".

Early life and career 

Schumacher was born in Kulm in West Prussia (now Chełmno in Poland), the son of a small businessman who was a member of the liberal German Free-minded Party and deputy in the municipal assembly. The young man was a brilliant student, but when the First World War broke out in 1914, he immediately abandoned his studies and joined the German Army. In December, at Bielawy west of Łowicz in Poland, he was so badly wounded that his right arm had to be amputated. After contracting dysentery, he was finally discharged from the army and was decorated with the Iron Cross Second class. Schumacher returned to his law and political studies in Halle, Leipzig and Berlin from which he graduated in 1919.

Inspired by Eduard Bernstein, Schumacher became a dedicated socialist and in 1918 joined the Social Democratic Party of Germany (SPD). He led ex-servicemen in forming Workers and Soldiers Councils in Berlin during the revolutionary days following the fall of the German Empire but opposed attempts by revolutionary left-wing groups to seize power. In 1920, the SPD sent him to Stuttgart to edit the party's newspaper there, the Schwäbische Tagwacht.

Schumacher was elected to the state legislature, the Free People's State of Württemberg Landtag in 1924. In 1928, he became the SPD leader in the state. To oppose the emerging Nazi Party, Schumacher helped organise socialist militias to oppose them. In 1930, he was elected to the national legislature, the Reichstag. In August 1932, he was elected to the SPD leadership group. At 38, he was youngest SPD member of the Reichstag.

Nazi regime 
Schumacher was staunchly anti-Nazi. In a Reichstag speech on 23 February 1932, he excoriated Nazism as "a continuous appeal to the inner swine in human beings" and stated the movement had been uniquely successful in "ceaselessly mobilizing human stupidity". Schumacher was arrested in July 1933, two weeks before the SPD was banned, and was severely beaten in prison. Schumacher was given the opportunity to sign a declaration in which he renounced any political activity if released, but unlike Fritz Bauer and seven other political prisoners, he refused to sign it. He spent the next ten years in Nazi concentration camps at Heuberg, Kuhberg, Flossenbürg, and Dachau. The camps were initially intended for exploitation of those deemed by the Nazis to be undesirable people, such as Jews, socialists, communists, and criminals. Beginning in 1940, the prison camps were overcrowded with transports from the eastern front, leading to disease outbreaks and starvation. Beginning in 1941, the Nazis initiated Action 14f13 to mass execute prisoners who were deemed unfit to work, and Schumacher and some other disabled veterans were granted leniency from the executions after they proved with their war medals that they had been disabled in service of Germany during World War I. The conditions in the camps continued to worsen and by 1943, nearly half of the prisoners died, in particular in Neuengamme of 106,000 inmates almost half died.

In 1943, when Schumacher was near death, his brother-in-law succeeded in persuading a Nazi official to have him released into his custody. Schumacher was arrested again in late 1944 and was in Neuengamme when the British arrived in April 1945.

Postwar 
Schumacher wanted to lead the SPD and bring Germany to socialism. By May 1945, he was already reorganising the SPD in Hanover without the permission of the occupation authorities. He soon found himself in a battle with Otto Grotewohl, the leader of the SPD in the Soviet Zone of Occupation, who argued the SPD should merge with the KPD to form a united socialist party. Schumacher rejected Grotewohl's proposal and in August called an SPD convention in Hanover, which elected him as the Western leader of the party.

In January 1946, the British and the Americans allowed the SPD to reform itself as a national party with Schumacher as leader. As the only SPD leader who had spent the whole Nazi period in Germany without collaborating, he had enormous prestige. He was certain that his right to lead Germany would be recognised by both the Allies and the German electorate. Schumacher met his match in Konrad Adenauer, the former mayor of Cologne, whom the Americans, not wanting to see socialism of any kind in Germany, were grooming for leadership. Adenauer united most of the prewar German conservatives into a new party, the Christian Democratic Union of Germany (CDU). Schumacher campaigned throughout 1948 and 1949 for a united socialist Germany and particularly for the nationalisation of heavy industry, whose owners he blamed for funding the Nazis' rise to power. When the occupying powers opposed his ideas, he denounced them. Adenauer opposed socialism on principle and also argued that the quickest way to get the Allies to restore self-government to Germany was to co-operate with them.

Schumacher wanted a new constitution with a strong national presidency since he was confident that he would occupy that post. The first draft of the 1949 Grundgesetz provided for a federal system with a weak national government, as was favoured both by the Allies and the CDU. Schumacher refused to give way and eventually, the Allies, keen to get the new German state functioning in the face of the Soviet challenge, acceded to some of Schumacher's demands. The new federal government would be dominant over the states, although the president would have limited powers.

1949 federal election 

The Federal Republic's first national elections were held in August 1949. Schumacher was convinced he would win, and most observers agreed with him. But Adenauer's new CDU had several advantages over the SPD. Much of the SPD's prewar power base was now part of the Soviet Zone, and the most conservative parts of prewar Germany, such as Bavaria and the Rhineland, were in the new Federal Republic of Germany. In addition, the American and the French occupying powers favoured Adenauer and did all they could to assist his campaign though the British remained neutral.

Further, the onset of the Cold War, particularly the behaviour of the Soviets and the German communists in the Soviet Zone, produced an antisocialist reaction in Germany as elsewhere. The SPD could very plausibly have won an election in 1945, but the tide had turned against it by 1949. That came even as the SPD became increasingly critical of the new East German government. Schumacher was especially critical and once called the communists "red-painted fascists". Schumacher attempted a heavy distinction in the public consciousness between his vision of "democratic socialism" and the realities in East Germany but still found his party partially damaged by association.

Another factor was the recovery of the German economy, mainly because of the currency reform of the CDU's Ludwig Erhard. Matters were further complicated by Schumacher's declining health. In September 1948, he had one of his legs amputated. Germans admired Schumacher's courage but doubted that he could carry out the duties of chancellor.

Although Schumacher's SPD won the most seats of any single party in the election (though the CDU and its sister party, the CSU, together won more seats), the CDU was able to form a centre-right coalition government with the Free Democratic Party, the Christian Social Union, and the German Party. Adenauer was elected chancellor, a shock for Schumacher. He refused to co-operate in parliamentary matters and denounced the CDU as agents of the capitalists and foreign powers.

Schumacher opposed the emerging new organisations of European co-operation: the Council of Europe, the European Coal and Steel Community and the European Defence Community. He saw them as devices to strengthen capitalism and to extend Allied control over Germany. That stand aroused the opposition of the other Western European socialist parties, and eventually, the SPD overruled him and sent delegates to the Council of Europe.

Death and legacy 
During the remainder of Adenauer's first term in office, Schumacher continued to oppose his government, but the rapid rise in German prosperity, the intensification of the Cold War and Adenauer's success in gaining Germany's acceptance in the international community all worked to undermine Schumacher's position. The SPD began to have serious doubts about going into another election with Schumacher as leader, particularly after he had a stroke in December 1951. They were spared having to deal with this dilemma when Schumacher died suddenly in August 1952.

References

Sources

Further reading 
 Peter Merseburger: Kurt Schumacher: Patriot, Volkstribun, Sozialdemokrat. Munich: Pantheon, 2010, .
 Maxwell, John Allen. "Social Democracy in a Divided Germany: Kurt Schumacher and the German Question, 1945-1952." Unpublished Ph.D. dissertation, West Virginia University, Department of History, Morgantown, West Virginia, 1969.

External links 
 

Social Democratic Party of Germany politicians
German Protestants
Protestants in the German Resistance
German anti-communists
German amputees
Candidates for President of Germany
People from Chełmno
People from West Prussia
German politicians with disabilities
Leipzig University alumni
1895 births
1952 deaths
Dachau concentration camp survivors
Flossenbürg concentration camp survivors
Neuengamme concentration camp survivors
Members of the Reichstag of the Weimar Republic
Recipients of the Iron Cross (1914), 2nd class
German Army personnel of World War I